The 2008–09 season was the fifth season of competitive association football in the Football League played by Milton Keynes Dons Football Club, a professional football club based in Milton Keynes, Buckinghamshire, England.

Following their successful promotion from League Two in the previous 2007–08 season, the club returned to League One. On 2 July 2008, following the resignation of manager Paul Ince, the club appointed former Chelsea midfielder Roberto Di Matteo, his first managerial role in football.

The season covers the period from 1 July 2008 to 30 June 2009.

Competitions

League One

Final table

Source: Sky Sports

Matches

Play-offs

FA Cup

Matches

League Cup

Matches

League Trophy

Matches

Player details
List of squad players, including number of appearances by competition.
Players with squad numbers struck through and marked  left the club during the playing season.

|}

Transfers

Transfers in

Transfers out

Loans in

Loans out

References

External links

Official Supporters Association website
MK Dons news on MKWeb

Milton Keynes Dons
Milton Keynes Dons F.C. seasons